Manius Aemilius Mamercinus was a three time consular tribune, in 405, 403 and 401 and one-time consul, in 410 BC, of the Roman Republic.

Aemilius belonged to the Aemilia gens, one of the oldest and most prominent patrician gens of the early Republic. Aemilius father was the thrice appointed dictator Mamercus Aemilius Mamercinus which would make the seven time consular tribune Lucius Aemilius Mamercinus his brother. Aemilius himself had no known descendants and later Aemilii Mamercini trace their ancestry from his brother Lucius.

Career

Consulship (410 BC) 
Aemilius first held the imperium in 410 BC as one of the two ordinary consuls of that year. His colleague in the office was Gaius Valerius Potitus Volusus. The consuls fought a successful war against the Aequi and the Volsci which resulted in the capture of the fortress of Arx Carventana. One of the consuls (most likely Valerius) were granted an ovatio for this. Their continued efforts in the war were somewhat hampered by the actions of the tribune of the plebs, Marcus Menenius, who vetoed a proposed levy while proposing a new agrarian law.

Military tribune with consular powers (405 - 401 BC) 
Aemilius would hold the imperium for a second time in 405 BC, this time as his first term as consular tribune. He shared the office with five others, Titus Quinctius Capitolinus Barbatus, Quintus Quinctius Cincinnatus, Gaius Julius Iulus, Aulus Manlius Vulso Capitolinus and Lucius Furius Medullinus, of which all were former consulars with the exception of Manlius. The consulars saw success against the Veii and began the so-called "siege of Veii" which would last for ten years.

In 403 BC Aemilius held his second consular tribuneship. He shared the office with Lucius Valerius Potitus (brother of his former colleague Volusus). Appius Claudius Crassus Inregillensis, Marcus Quinctilius Varus. Lucius Julius Iulus and Marcus Furius Fusus. Unlike his previous consular tribuneship this primarily consisted of newcomers to the imperium. The year saw the continuation of the war started in 406 against the Veii with all consulars (including Aemilius) leading armies against the Veii with the exception of Claudius who remained in Rome. The long years of war and new payments towards the soldiers seems to have strained the economy of Rome and the two censors, Marcus Furius Camillus and Marcus Postumius Albinus Regillensis imposed new taxes targeting bachelors and orphans

Two years later, in 401 BC, Aemilius would again be elected to the role of consular tribune. He shared the office with his former colleague, Valerius from 403, and four others, Camillus (the censor from 403), Lucius Julius Iulus (close relative of his former colleague Julius), Caeso Fabius Ambustus and Gnaeus Cornelius Cossus. The year saw war against the Volsci, Falerii, Veii and the Capena. Aemilius held the command against the Veii. Outside of war there was continued civil strife within Rome with a conflict involving three of the plebeian tribunes, Marcus Acutius, Gaius Lacerius and Gnaeus Trebonius, in regards to the Lex Trebonia. Additionally there was legal procedures against two former consulars Lucius Verginius Tricostus Esquilinus and Manius Sergius Fidenas, led by the other three plebeian tribunes and targeting the consulars for their conduct and defeat against the Veientanes and Faliscans. Eventually the plebeian tribunes united under a proposal of a new agrarian law.

See also

References 

5th-century BC Roman consuls
Roman consular tribunes
Aemilii